Kaleidoscope is a 1966 British comedy crime film starring Warren Beatty and Susannah York.

The film had its world premiere on 8 September 1966 at the Warner Theatre in the West End of London.

Plot
After leaving his lover Angel McGinnis behind in London, rich playboy Barney Lincoln breaks into a playing card manufacturer in Geneva to mark the cards, and then proceeds to break the bank at major European casinos.

Barney meets up with Angel again in Monte Carlo, where he wins a great deal of money, but her suspicions after he left England caused her to consult her father, a detective from Scotland Yard. He blackmails Barney into helping him catch a drug smuggler named Harry Dominion, who owns a casino and also has a weakness for high stakes poker.

Cast

Production
It was the third film Jack Smight directed for Warners. Smight called the script "terrific... a little hard to believe, but nevertheless a jolly fun premise laced with great humor."

He says producer Elliot Kastner cast Sandra Dee as the female lead mostly because Warren Beatty wanted to sleep with her. Smight said, "Though I had worked with Sandra in my first film...and had regard for her, I couldn’t conceive of her playing a role of the British girl that the script called for...So much for the producer’s wanting to protect the integrity of a fine screenplay."

During preproduction in France, Kastner admitted he did not want Dee in the film. Smight asked Jack Warner if he could have Susannah York and Warner agreed; Dee was paid off.

Smight says Beatty was undisciplined during filming. They would rehearse scenes but then "just as we were about to roll the camera, Warren would ask if he could try something different from what we had earlier settled upon. I wanted to be flexible in the event that what he wanted to do was better than what we had planned. Inevitably it wasn't."

Soundtrack
The soundtrack to the film was released on Warner Bros. WS-1633. It was given a short but warm review by Cash Box in the October 22, 1966 issue with the magazine picking the tracks "Angel's Theme" and "Dominion's Deal" as the better efforts.. 

One night Stanley Myers and Barry Fantoni were at the Chi Chi club discussing the need for a song to match the intense switched on vibe of the movie. A group called Romeo Z came on stage and caused the ceiling to shake. This was actually the club's resident group. In six or seven seconds they knew they had what they wanted and some time later the group was at the recording session.

References

External links

1966 films
British crime comedy films
Films set in London
Films set in Monaco
1960s heist films
1960s crime comedy films
Films about gambling
British heist films
Films shot at Pinewood Studios
Films directed by Jack Smight
Films scored by Stanley Myers
1966 comedy films
Films produced by Elliott Kastner
1960s English-language films
1960s British films